The Natural and Built Environment Bill (NBA) is one of the three laws which will replace New Zealand's Resource Management Act 1991 (RMA). The NBA aims to promote the protection and enhancement of the natural and built environment, while providing for housing and preparing for the effects of climate change.

An exposure draft of the bill was released in June 2021 to allow for public submissions. It is expected that the law will be enacted within the next three years.

Exposure draft
The Natural and Built Environment Bill exposure draft features many contrasts to its RMA predecessor. This includes the ability to set environmental limits, the goal to reduce greenhouse gas emissions, the provisions to increase housing supply, and the ability for planners to access activities based on outcomes. A notable difference is the bill's stronger attention to Māori involvement in decision making and Māori environmental issues. Greater emphasis is put on upholding the nation's founding document, the Treaty of Waitangi. 

Under the bill, over 100 plans and policy statements will be replaced by just 14 plans. These plans will be prepared by new Regional Council Planning Committees and their planning secretariats. The committee will have an array of responsibilities, including the ability to vote on plan changes, set environmental limits for the region, and consider recommendations from hearings. The planning secretariat would draft the plans and provide expert advice.

Provisions
In mid November 2022, the Natural and Built Environment Bill was introduced into parliament. In its initial version, the bill establishes a National Planning Framework (NPF) setting out rules for land use and regional resource allocation. The NPF also replaces the Government's policy statements on water, air quality and other issues with an umbrella framework. Under NPF's framework, all 15 regions will be required to develop a Natural and Built Environment Plan (NBE) that will replace the 100 district and regional plans, harmonising consenting and planning rules. An independent national Māori entity will also be established to provide input into the NPF and ensure compliance with the Treaty of Waitangi's provisions.

Key provisions have included: 
Every person has a responsibility to protect and sustain the health and well-being of the natural environment for the benefit of all New Zealanders.
Every person has a duty to avoid, minimise, remedy, offset, or provide redress for adverse effects including "unreasonable noise."
Prescribes restrictions relating to land, coastal marine area, river and lake beds, water, and discharges.
Establishes a national planning framework (NPF) to provide directions on integrated environmental management, resolve conflicts on environmental matters, and to set environmental limits and strategic directions. This framework will take the form of regulations, which will be considered secondary legislation.
Sets Te Ture Whaimana as the primary direction-setting document for the Waikato and Waipā rivers and activities within their catchments affecting the rivers.
Resource allocation are guided by the principles of sustainability, efficiency, and equity.
Prescribes the criteria for setting environmental limits, human health limits, exemptions, targets, and management units. 
Outlines the process for submitting and appealing case to the Environment Court.
Outlines the resource consent process.

History

Background
A 2020 review of the Resource Management Act 1991 found various problems with the existing resource management system, and concluded that it could not cope with modern environmental pressures. In January 2021, the government announced that the RMA will be replaced by three acts, with the Natural and Built Environment Bill being the primary of the three.

An exposure draft of the NBA was released in late June 2021.

Introduction
On 14 November 2022, the Sixth Labour Government of New Zealand introduced the Natural and Built Environment Bill into parliament alongside the companion Spatial Planning Bill (SPA) as part of its efforts to replace the Resource Management Act. In response, the opposition National and ACT parties criticised the two replacement bills on the grounds that it created more centralisation, bureaucracy, and did little to reform the problems associated with the RMA process. The Green Party expressed concerns about the perceived lack of environment protection in the proposed legislation.

A third bill, the Climate Adaptation Bill (CAA), is expected to be introduced in 2023 with the goal of passing it into law in 2024. The CAA will establish the systems and mechanisms for protecting communities against the effects of climate change such as managed retreat in response to rising levels. The Climate Adaptation Bill also deals with funding the costs of managing climate change.

First reading
The National and Built Environment Bill passed its first reading in the New Zealand House of Representatives on 22 November 2022 by a margin of 74 to 45 votes. The governing Labour and allied Green parties supported the bill while the opposition National, ACT, and Māori parties voted against the bill. The bill's sponsor David Parker and other Labour Members of Parliament including Associate Environment Minister Phil Twyford, Rachel Brooking, and Green MP Eugenie Sage advocated revamping the resource management system due to the unwieldy nature of the Resource Management Act. National MPs Scott Simpson, Chris Bishop, Sam Uffindell, and ACT MP Simon Court argued that the NBA would do little to improve the resource management system and address the centralisation of power and decision-making regarding resource management. Māori Party co-leader Debbie Ngarewa-Packer argued that the bill was insufficient in advancing co-governance and expressed concern that a proposed national Māori entity would undermine the power of Māori iwi (tribes) and hapu (sub-groups). The bill was subsequently referred to the Environment Select Committee.

Notes

References

External links

2021 in New Zealand law
2021 in the environment
2022 in New Zealand law
2022 in the environment
Environmental law in New Zealand
Environmental mitigation
Natural resource management
Statutes of New Zealand
Urban planning in New Zealand